Hakan is a common Turkish forename, based on the Turkish language variant of the imperial title Khagan.

The name is also spelled Khakan or Khaqan in other parts of the world, with the same etymology.

Given name
Ahmet Hakan Coşkun (born 1967), Turkish columnist
Hakan Akkaya (born 1995), Turkish para fencer
Hakan Akman (born 1989), Turkish footballer
Hakan Altun (born 1972), Turkish singer
Hakan Arıkan (born 1982), Turkish footballer
Hakan Arslan (born 1988), Turkish footballer
Hakan Aslantaş (born 1985), Turkish footballer
Hakan Ayik, Turkish-Australian criminal
Hakan B. Gülsün (1960–2009), Turkish art historian 
Hakan Balta (born 1983), Turkish-German footballer
Hakan Bayraktar (born 1976), Turkish footballer
Hakan Çalhanoğlu (born 1994), Turkish footballer
Hakan Cengiz (born 1967), Turkish-German footballer
Hakan Çevik (born 1976), Turkish Paralympic rifle shooter
Hakan Demir (born 1968), Turkish basketball player
Hakan Demirel (born 1986), Turkish basketball player
Hakan Dinç (born 1963), Turkish race car driver
Hakan Fertelli, Turkish volleyball player
Hakan Fidan (born 1968), Chief of Turkish national intelligence agency
Hakan Gökçek (born 1993), Turkish-Australian footballer
Hakan Hayrettin (born 1970), Turkish-British footballer
Hakan Karahan, Turkish writer
Hakan Kıran (born 1962), Turkish architect
Hakan Kiper (born 1973), Turkish swimmer
Hakan Koç (born 1980), Turkish  wrestler
Hakan Köseoğlu (born 1981), Turkish basketball player
Hakan Kutlu (born 1972), Turkish footballer
Hakan Massoud Navabi (born 1990), Afghan origin poet, writer
Hakan Özmert (born 1985), Turkish-French footballer
Hakan Özoğuz (born 1976), Turkish musician
Hakan Peker (born 1961), Turkish dancer, songwriter, singer, 
Hakan Söyler (born 1983), Turkish footballer
Hakan Sürsal (born 1963), Turkish poet
Hakan Şükür (born 1971), Turkish footballer
Hakan Turan (born 1992), Turkish footballer
Hakan Ünsal (born 1973), Turkish footballer
Hakan Utangaç (born 1965), Turkish musician
Hakan Ünsal, Turkish footballer
Hakan Yakin (born 1977), Turkish-Swiss footballer
Hakan Yılmaz (political scientist), Turkish academic
Hakan Yılmaz (weightlifter) (born 1982), Turkish weightlifter
Musa Hakan Asyalı (born 1969), Turkish Biomedical Engineering scientist

Others
Shahid Khaqan Abbasi, Ex acting Prime Minister of Pakistan

Fictional characters
Hakan, a Turkish oil wrestler in the Street Fighter video game series
 Hakan II, the child emperor of Caldeum in the Diablo III video game, who is actually Belial, the Lord of Lies, in disguise.

See also
Håkan, a Swedish name
Håkon, a Norwegian name

Turkish masculine given names